The 2022 Super League of Malawi (known as the TNM Super League for sponsorship reasons) is the 36th season of the Super League of Malawi, the top professional league for association football clubs in Malawi since its establishment in 1986. The season started on 19 March 2022 and was ended on 19 November 2022. Nyasa Big Bullets are the defending champions.

Nyasa Big Bullets retained the Super League title following their 3–1 win over Moyale Barracks on 12 November 2022.

Teams 
Sixteen teams competed in the league – the top thirteen teams from the previous season and the three promoted teams from the regional leagues: Rumphi United, Dedza Dynamos and Sable Farming.
Other changes
 Mighty Wanderers were renamed as Mighty Mukuru Wanderers during the season.

Stadiums and locations

League table

Top scorers

References

External links
Official Website

2021-22
Malawi
Malawi